Route 550 is a  road stretching from Route 50 in Waimea to Kōkeʻe State Park on the island of Kauai.

Route description

Leaving Waimea, Hawaii Route 550 increases in elevation to over two thousand feet, at times the road is winding and steep.  For much of its length, Hawaii Route 550 is adjacent to Waimea Canyon.

Major intersections

External links

Route Log for Hawaii Route 550

Transportation in Kauai County, Hawaii
 0550